San Marino participated at the 2018 Summer Youth Olympics in Buenos Aires, Argentina from 6 October to 18 October 2018.

Archery

San Marino qualified one athlete.

Individual

Team

Swimming

San Marino qualified two athletes.

Table tennis

San Marino qualified one athlete.

References

2018 in Sammarinese sport
Nations at the 2018 Summer Youth Olympics
San Marino at the Youth Olympics